The women's 4 × 100 metres relay was the only women's relay on the Athletics at the 1964 Summer Olympics program in Tokyo.  It was held on 20 October and 21 October 1964.  15 teams, for a total of 60 athletes, from 15 nations competed.  The first round was held on 20 October with the final on 21 October. The world record time of the Polish team was erased in 1969, after Ewa Klobukowska failed a gendertest in Kyiv, but their gold medal result was allowed to stand.

Results

First round

The top four teams in each of the 2 heats advanced.

First round, heat 1

First round, heat 2

Final

All three medallist teams broke the world record in the final.

References

 Official Report

Athletics at the 1964 Summer Olympics
Relay foot races at the Olympics
4 × 100 metres relay
1964 in women's athletics
Women's events at the 1964 Summer Olympics